Francis Knox (1754 – 12 April 1821) was a Member of Parliament (MP) for Philipstown from 1798 to 1800.

References

1754 births
1821 deaths
Members of the Parliament of Ireland (pre-1801) for King's County constituencies